Bujurquina is a genus of cichlid fish endemic to South America. Most species in the genus are restricted to the western Amazon Basin. The only exceptions are B. mariae from the Orinoco Basin, and B. oenolaemus and B. vittata from the Paraguay–Paraná Basin.

Species
There are currently 18 recognized species in this genus:
 Bujurquina apoparuana S. O. Kullander, 1986
 Bujurquina cordemadi S. O. Kullander, 1986
 Bujurquina eurhinus S. O. Kullander, 1986
 Bujurquina hophrys S. O. Kullander, 1986
 Bujurquina huallagae S. O. Kullander, 1986
 Bujurquina labiosa S. O. Kullander, 1986
 Bujurquina mariae C. H. Eigenmann, 1922
 Bujurquina megalospilus S. O. Kullander, 1986
 Bujurquina moriorum S. O. Kullander, 1986
 Bujurquina oenolaemus S. O. Kullander, 1987
 Bujurquina ortegai S. O. Kullander, 1986
 Bujurquina pardus Arbour, Barriga S. & López-Fernández, 2014
 Bujurquina peregrinabunda S. O. Kullander, 1986
 Bujurquina robusta S. O. Kullander, 1986
 Bujurquina syspilus Cope, 1872
 Bujurquina tambopatae S. O. Kullander, 1986 
 Bujurquina vittata Heckel, 1840
 Bujurquina zamorensis Regan, 1905

References

Cichlasomatini
Fish of South America
Cichlid genera
Taxa named by Sven O. Kullander